The Parallel Ocean Program (POP) is a three-dimensional ocean circulation model designed primarily for studying the ocean climate system. The model is developed and supported primarily by researchers at LANL.

External links

Physical oceanography